The Portage Lake Observatory (PLO) was an astronomical observatory owned and operated by the University of Michigan (UM). Construction at the site began in 1948, and the facility was closed in 1975.

Other observatories that UM has operated include the Detroit Observatory (Ann Arbor, Michigan, 1854), the Angell Hall Observatory (Ann Arbor, Michigan, 1927), the Lamont–Hussey Observatory (South Africa, 1928), the McMath–Hulbert Observatory (Lake Angelus, Michigan, 1930), and the Peach Mountain Observatory (Dexter, Michigan, 1955).

Telescopes

 A  reflecting telescope was built by Tinsley Laboratories in 1969 and installed at PLO the same year. In 1975 it was moved to Kitt Peak National Observatory near Tucson, Arizona, where it is now known as the McGraw-Hill Telescope.
 The  Heber Doust Curtis Telescope is a Schmidt camera that began operating at PLO in 1950.  It was moved to the Cerro Tololo Inter-American Observatory in Chile in 1967, where it is referred to as the Curtis Schmidt Telescope.

See also 
 MDM Observatory
 List of astronomical observatories

References

External links
 University Lowbrow Astronomers homepage
 Department of Astronomy at the University of Michigan

Astronomical observatories in Michigan
University of Michigan
Buildings and structures in Washtenaw County, Michigan
Defunct astronomical observatories
1948 establishments in Michigan